José María Espejo-Saavedra Conesa (born 22 July 1976, in Madrid) is a Spanish politician serving as Member of the Congress of Deputies and chair of the Congress' Committee on International Cooperation for Development since 2019. He is a member of the Citizens party.

In previous years, Espejo-Saavedra has served as a Member of the Catalan Parliament from 2006 to 2019 and Second Vice President of the Catalan Parliament from 2015 to 2019.

Biography 
He studied Law at the Autonomous University of Madrid and has a master's degree in insolvency administration obtained at the Lawyer Association of Barcelona, he also has some other minors obtained at ESADE. Before becoming a member of parliament he worked as a lawyer of La Caixa, being the head of the legal advise team.

He has been a member of the Citizens party ever since its establishment in 2006 and he is now in charge of the legal affairs of the Steering Committee. He was number seven in the list of the 2012 Catalan regional election and was elected member of parliament. He was re-elected in the 2015 and 2017 regional elections.

Congress of Deputies 
Espejo-Saavedra left the Catalan Parliament in 2019 after being elected Member of the Congress of Deputies in the 2019 general election. On July 16, 2019, his party nominated him to be a member of the Congress' Permanent Deputation. On July 30, 2019, he assumed as chairman of the Congress of Deputies Committee on International Cooperation for Development.

Committee assignments 
 Constitutional Committee
 Committee on Justice
 Committee on International Cooperation for Development – (Chair)
 Committee on Rules

References

External links
"Information of the Member of Parliament: José María Espejo-Saavedra Conesa", Parliament of Catalonia. Retrieved on 13 July 2013.

1976 births
Living people
Members of the Parliament of Catalonia
Second Vice-Presidents of the Parliament of Catalonia
Members of the 11th Parliament of Catalonia
Members of the 12th Parliament of Catalonia
Members of the 13th Congress of Deputies (Spain)
Members of the 14th Congress of Deputies (Spain)